Fanlight was an unincorporated community in Wetzel County, West Virginia, United States. Its post office no longer exists.

References 

Unincorporated communities in West Virginia